Stradiotto is a surname. Notable people with the surname include:

Marco Stradiotto (born 1965), Italian politician
Mark Stradiotto, Canadian chemist

Italian-language surnames